Dazrud (also Romanized as Dazrūd; also known as Duzrud-e Bala) is a village in Malfejan Rural District, in the Central District of Siahkal County, Gilan Province, Iran. At the 2006 census, its population was 37, in 13 families.

References 

Populated places in Siahkal County